Yalabad (also Romanized as Yalābād and Yelābād) is a village in Ilat-e Qaqazan-e Gharbi Rural District, Kuhin District, Qazvin County, Qazvin Province, Iran. At the 2006 census, its population was 437, in 99 families. This village is populated by Azerbaijani Turks.

References 

Populated places in Qazvin County